Pyrus boissieriana, the Boissier pear and telka, is a species of Pyrus (pear) native to the Kopet Dag region on the Turkmenistan and Iranian border. In its native locales it is cultivated as a rootstock for domestic pears. 

Pyrus boissieriana is a regional deciduous tree in the woodland which also has many different fruit trees, shrubs, and vines valuable for human use. It is named after botanist Pierre Edmond Boissier.

References and external links

boissieriana
Flora of Turkmenistan
Flora of Iran
Taxa named by Friedrich Alexander Buhse